2021 was the 60th edition of the annual Albanian music competition . The three live shows were hosted by Ardit Gjebrea, Isli Islami, Jonida Maliqi, Kelvi Kadilli and Xhemi Shehu. Ronela Hajati with the song "" emerged as the winner of the contest and represented Albania in the Eurovision Song Contest 2022 in Turin, Italy.

Format 

The contest consisted of two semi-finals on 27 and 28 December and the grand final on 29 December 2021. The three live shows were hosted by Albanian presenters Ardit Gjebrea, Isli Islami, Kelvi Kadilli, Xhemi Shehu and singer Jonida Maliqi. In contrast to the prior year's outdoor location due to the ongoing pandemic of COVID-19, the contest was again held as per tradition at the Palace of Congresses in Tirana, Albania.

Contestants 

RTSH opened an application period for interested artists and composers to submit their applications between 2 July and 30 September 2021 to the broadcaster before extending it to 15 October. A provisory list of 20 artists followed on 9 November 2021, shortlisted by a jury panel consisting of Gjebrea, Arta Marku, Elton Deda, Klodian Qafoku, Marjan Deda, Redi Treni and Zefina Hasani to compete in the semi-finals of the contest. Their songs were made available to listen to on the RTSH's official YouTube channel on 3 December 2021.

Shows

Contestants night 

The first show took place on 27 December 2021 at 21:00 (CET). Three out of six contestants of the New artists section were selected by a seven-member jury panel, consisting of Anxhela Peristeri, Agim Doçi, Anxhela Faber, Osman Mula, Rozana Radi, Olsa Toqi and Olti Curri, to advance to the third show of the contest. However, all 14 contestants of the Established artists section advanced to the third show with no qualifications taking place beforehand.

Key:
 Qualifier

Duet night 

The second show took place on 28 December 2021 at 21:00 (CET). The contestants performed in a duet with previous personalities of  except the three newcomers, who presented acoustic versions of their songs.

Eurovision night 

The third show took place on 29 December 2021 at 21:00 (CET). For the first time, the contestants were permitted to perform in English or any other language. The winner of the contest was determined by the combination of the votes by the seven-member jury panel of the first show of the contest. Ronela Hajati with the song "" emerged as the winner and was thus announced as Albania's representative for the Eurovision Song Contest 2022.

Key:
 Winner
 Second place
 Third place

See also 
 Festivali i Këngës
 Eurovision Song Contest 2022
 Albania in the Eurovision Song Contest 2022

References 

2021
2021 in Albanian music
2021 in Albanian television
2021 song contests
December 2021 events in Europe
Eurovision Song Contest 2022